Storthes Hall is a part of the township of Kirkburton, West Yorkshire, England. A heavily wooded area, it comprises a single road, Storthes Hall Lane, which links Kirkburton with the nearby villages of Farnley Tyas and Thurstonland. The most significant properties in the area are Storthes Hall Mansion (now a private property), Storthes Hall Hospital (located further west with the main administrative block surviving as a derelict building) and, finally, Storthes Hall Park Student Village which has been built on the old hospital site.

History

The Mansion
Storthes Hall Mansion was built as a private house for the mill owning Horsfall family in about 1788; it was later owned by the Bill family, Dorothy, daughter of William Horsfall, having married Robert Bill, of Farley Hall, Staffordshire, and the house being inherited by their son, Charles Horsfall Bill. It is located close to Kirkburton centre and was renamed The Mansion Hospital when it became an independently managed facility for people with learning disabilities. After the Mansion Hospital closed in 1991, the building, which is Grade II listed, was converted back for private residential use.

Storthes Hall Hospital

An area to the west of The Mansion, closer to Farnley Tyas, was developed as Storthes Hall Hospital in the early 20th century. After the Storthes Hall Hospital closed in 1992, part of the Storthes Hall Hospital site was used as a training facility for Huddersfield Town A.F.C. before their move to their state of the art Canalside facility off Leeds Road in 2011.

Storthes Hall Park Student Village
Much of the area previously occupied by the Storthes Hall Hospital was developed as a student campus, the Storthes Hall Park Student Village, for the University of Huddersfield in the mid 1990s. The village accommodates the largest single concentration of students from the University with over 1,300 students staying every year.

References

Further reading

External links 
Storthes Hall Park Student Village

Villages in West Yorkshire
Kirkburton